John Neilson may refer to:

John Neilson (Canadian politician) (1776–1848), a Canadian newspaper editor and politician.
John Neilson (colonel) (1745–1833), New Jersey officer and member of the New Jersey legislature
John Neilson (architect) (c. 1770–1827), Irish-born American master carpenter, joiner and architect
John Neilson (footballer, born 1874) (fl. 1900s), Scottish footballer
John Neilson (footballer, born 1921) (1921–1988), Scottish footballer
John Alexander Neilson (1858–1915), Scottish rugby union player
Shaw Neilson (1872–1942), Australian poet

See also
John Nielsen (disambiguation)
John Neilson Gladstone
John Neilson Lake